Cyperus carinatus is a sedge of the family Cyperaceae that is native to northern Australia.

The plant blooms between March and August producing brown flowers.

In Western Australia it is found around creeks and rivers in the Kimberley region where it grows in sandy soils. It is also found in the Northern Territory and in Queensland.

See also
List of Cyperus species

References

Plants described in 1810
Flora of Western Australia
carinatus
Taxa named by Robert Brown (botanist, born 1773)
Flora of Queensland
Flora of the Northern Territory